Invincible Knights Errant is a 2011 martial arts television series from Mainland China, based on the wuxia classics The Seven Heroes and Five Gallants. The show stars Alex Man as Bao Zheng from China's Song Dynasty and Vincent Zhao as Zhan Zhao.

Cast
 Alex Man as Bao Zheng
 Vincent Zhao as Zhan Zhao
 Wang Tonghui as Bai Yutang
 Xu Qiwen as Xiao Jing
 Qin Yan as Chen Lin
 Huo Zhengyan as Emperor Renzong of Song
 Fu Yiwei as Empress Dowager Liu
 Liu Weihua as Lu Fang
 Chen Chuhan as Han Zhang
 Chen Xiaofei as Jiang Ping
 Sui Shuyang as Xu Qing
 Zhao Chulun as Ding Zhaohui
 Ma Xiaojun as Ai Hu
 Chen Yun as Qin E
 Zhang Heng as Tang Juan
 Kou Zhenhai as Pang Ji
 Liu Naiyi as Ding Zhaolan
 Mou Fengbin as Zhi Hua
 Wu Qianqian as Consort Li

International broadcast
It first aired in Thailand on Channel 7 beginning September 13, 2013 on Wednesdays to Fridays at 8:30 a.m.

References

2011 Chinese television series debuts
Fictional depictions of Bao Zheng in television
Television shows based on The Seven Heroes and Five Gallants
Television shows set in Kaifeng
Gong'an television series